Denis Berger (born 14 April 1983) is an Austrian footballer who plays for Türkspor Stuttgart.

Statistics

References

External links

1983 births
Living people
Austrian footballers
VfB Stuttgart II players
Sportfreunde Siegen players
KSV Hessen Kassel players
SV Ried players
SSV Jahn Regensburg players
Kickers Offenbach players
VfL Bochum players
FC Hansa Rostock players
SG Sonnenhof Großaspach players
Austrian Football Bundesliga players
2. Bundesliga players
3. Liga players
Association football midfielders